As Long as I Got You may refer to:
"As Long as I Got You" (Lily Allen song) 2014
"As Long as I Got You" (Laura Lee song) 1968
"As Long as I Got You", a 2010 song by Dave Lee